Cyathophorum  is a genus of moss in the family Hypopterygiaceae. Seven species are found across Africa, southern and eastern Asia, through to Australia and Pacific Islands.

References

External links 

Moss genera
Bryopsida